Trozos de Mi Alma, Vol. 2 (Eng.: Pieces of My Soul, Vol. 2) is the seventh studio album by Marco Antonio Solís. It was released on September 26, 2006. It became his sixth number-one set on the Billboard Top Latin Albums. Like his 1999 release Trozos de Mi Alma, this album includes songs written by Solís that were previously recorded by other artists, such as Laura Flores ("Antes de Que Te Vayas" and Te Voy a Esperar"), José Javier Solís ("Quien Se Enamoró"), Pablo Montero ("Pídemelo Todo"), Victoria ("Hay Veces"), Rocío Dúrcal ("Extráñandote" and "Yo Creía Que Sí"), Paulina Rubio ("Ojalá") and Marisela ("Dios Bendiga Nuestro Amor" and "No Puedo Olvidarlo"). The album was released in a standard CD presentation and in a CD/DVD combo, including the music video for the first single "Antes de Que Te Vayas", the track "Sin Lado Izquierdo" (first included on his album Razón de Sobra) and bonus materials. It received a nomination for a Grammy Award for Best Latin Pop Album. “Antes de Que Te Vayas” served as the opening theme for the novela  Mundo de Fieras starring Cesar Evora, Gaby Espino, and Edith Gonzalez.

Track listing

All songs written and composed by Marco Antonio Solís

DVD

Charts

Weekly charts

Year-end charts

Sales and certifications

References

2006 albums
Marco Antonio Solís albums
Fonovisa Records albums
Self-covers albums